Valeriia Kirdiasheva (born 28 November 2000) is a Russian handball player who plays for Handball Club Lada in the Russian Super League.

She also represented Russia at the 2019 Women's U-19 European Handball Championship in Hungary, placing 4th and at the 2018 Women's Youth World Handball Championship in Poland, were the Russian team won the final tournament.

On 15 January 2021, she extended her contract with Handball Club Lada, until the summer of 2022.

Achievements
Youth World Championship:
Gold Medalist: 2018

Individual awards  
 All-Star Centre back of the Youth World Championship: 2018

References

External links
 Profile on the Russian Handball Federation

2000 births
Living people
Russian female handball players
People from Orenburg Oblast
Sportspeople from Orenburg Oblast
21st-century Russian women